Iruvar Ullam may refer to:
 Iruvar Ullam (1963 film), an Indian Tamil-language romance film
 Iruvar Ullam (2021 film), an Indian Tamil-language family drama film